One of the ways in which ranked voting systems vary is whether an individual vote must express a minimum number of preferences to avoid being considered invalid ("spoiled" or "informal"). Possibilities are:
 Full preferential voting (FPV) requires all candidates to be ranked
 Optional preferential voting (OPV) requires only one candidate, the voter's first preference, to be indicated
 Semi-optional preferential voting requires ranking some number greater than one but less than the total number of candidates.

Ranked-voting systems typically use a ballot paper in which the voter is required to write numbers 1, 2, 3, etc. opposite the name of the candidate who is their first, second, third, etc. preference. In OPV and semi-optional systems, candidates not explicitly ranked by the voter are implicitly ranked lower than all numbered candidates. Some OPV jurisdictions permit a ballot expressing a single preference to use some other mark than the digit '1', such as a cross or tick-mark, opposite the preferred candidate's name, on the basis that the voter's intention is clear; other do not, arguing for example that an 'X' might be an expression of dislike. FPV may not be possible if write-in candidates are allowed.

In a transferable-vote system like the single transferable vote (STV) or instant runoff voting (IRV), a ballot is initially allocated to the first-preference candidate but may be transferred one or more times to successively lower preferences. If there is no lower preference available when such a transfer is applicable, the ballot is said to be exhausted. In such cases FPV prevents exhausted ballots. On the other hand, it increases the risk of invalid ballots: the more numbers a voter is require to enter, the greater the opportunity for mistakes, by repeating or skipping numbers or skipping candidates. Some Australian elections which mandate FPV have reduced informal votes by adding group voting tickets "above the line" on ballot papers: these allow voters to select a complete ranking prepared by one of the parties, instead of manually entering personal preferences "below the line".

Australia
The terms OPV and FPV are used mainly in Australia, in relation to elections at state and territory and Commonwealth (federal) level, which use proportional representation (STV) or preferential voting (IRV).

OPV is used in elections in the Australian state of New South Wales. It was used in Queensland from 1992 to 2015. and in the Northern Territory in 2016.

In both the Tasmanian House of Assembly and the Tasmanian Legislative Council, semi-optional voting is used, with a minimum number of preferences required to be expressed; but there is no requirement to complete the entire ballot paper. Elections for all other Australian lower houses use full-preferential voting. In the Victorian Legislative Council, semi-optional voting is used if a voter chooses to vote below the line. Voting above the line requires only a ‘1’ being placed in one box, and group voting tickets voting has applied since 1988.

The Australian Senate voting reform of 2016 switched from full-preferential voting to optional. A minimum number is specified in the instructions on the ballot paper. Since in the past a single number '1' above the line was valid, that is still a formal vote even though voters are encouraged to number six squares.

Elsewhere
STV Elections in Malta, in the Republic of Ireland, and in Northern Ireland use OPV. The ranked-choice voting system used in Maine, United States, can be considered optional-preferential as voters are allowed to rank just one candidate. The system also allows voters to skip one ranking (e.g. marking a first choice and a third choice, but not a second choice). In that case, the next ranking would be advanced to the next highest ranking, but more than one skip exhausts the ballot.

References

Instant-runoff voting